Novius koebelei is a species of ladybird beetle native to Australia. It is also present in the wild in New Zealand, where it is of exotic origin. In New Zealand, it was first reported in 2006, having been found in Auckland. It has been known under many names; due to variation in its colouration, it has been described as new six times after its original description in 1892.

This species was introduced into California for biocontrol, alongside N. cardinalis. It is not thought to persist there now, however.

Description
Compared to the better-known Novius cardinalis, koebelei typically has much more strongly confluent markings. This often creates a large concurrent red patch on each elytron, though some individuals may be entirely uniform red, and other variants exist.

References

Beetles of Australia
Coccinellidae
Beetles of New Zealand
Beetles described in 1892